Alternative tourism combines tourist products or individual tourist services, different from mass tourism by means of supply, organization and the human resources involved. Other examples of different terms include "intelligent" or "motivated tourism." In addition, "anti-tourism" or "participative tourism" are some others. That was just to name few of them. Natural, social, and community value in which allow both host and guest to enjoy positive, worthwhile and shared experience.

Forms 
The term "alternative tourism" tries to include the concepts of active tourism as well as explorer and encounter travel even with the concept of committed tourism. The following lists try to enumerate some of the styles of alternative tourism.

Active tourism 
 hiking
 trekking
 biking
 adventure tourism
 snowshoeing
 ski mountaineering
 rafting
 diving
 caving
 climbing
 horseback riding

Explore and encounter travel 
 historical places
 archeological sites
 foreign communities
 foreign cultures
 rural tourism
 ecotourism
 cultural and historical heritage
 wine
 traditional cuisine
 ethnography
 traditional music
 handicrafts

Committed tourism 
 voluntary service overseas
 aid and assistance
 archeological digs
 international work camps
 justice
 solidarity tourism
 religion

Terminology critiques 
Since the term alternative is ambiguous, there are numerous critical remarks stating that the concept is only " (...) a fashionable idea among those who are dissatisfied with the nature of mass tourism (...)". The critics state, that alternative tourism lacks a clear definition of what is the tourism style alternative to. The origins of the term can be found in two alternating concepts:
 Rejection of modern mass consumerism
 Concern about the social impact in third-world countries

Others express their critical opinions regarding the term as fetish-adjective, miracle-word, mythical-term.

See also
 Alternative Tourism Group (in Palestine)

References

External links 
 Bulgarian Association for Alternative Tourism
 Green Olive Tours - Travel Agency for Alternative Tourism in Palestine/Israel
 Arttours - Artists exploring alternative tourism in Stuttgart

Types of tourism